Heliura phaeosoma is a moth of the subfamily Arctiinae. It was described by Herbert Druce in 1905. It is found in Venezuela.

References

Arctiinae
Moths described in 1905